The Priest (DePriest) is a mountain in Nelson County, Virginia.  The peak of the mountain is the highest point in the county. 
The mountain is on a spur off the main Blue Ridge Mountains, about  3.5 miles (5.5 km) east of Maintop Mountain, located in the Priest Wilderness of the George Washington National Forest.

The Priest stands within the watershed of the Tye River, which drains into the James River.
The north side of The Priest drains into Coxs Creek, thence into the Tye River.
The south side of The Priest drains into Rocky Run, thence into the Tye.
The west side of The Priest drains into Shoe Creek, thence into the Piney River and the Tye River.

The Appalachian Trail, a 2,193-mile (3,529.29-km) National Scenic Trail from Georgia to Maine, runs across the summit of The Priest. The summit is reachable via the Appalachian Trail from a trail head along Virginia State Route 56. The hike gains 3000 vertical feet from base to summit.

Crabtree Falls flows down the Priest's northwest slope. The Crabtree Falls trail and Forest Development Road 826 can be used for access to the Appalachian Trail and the Priest's summit.

References

External links 
  
  PeakBagger.com: The Priest
  summitpost.org: The Priest

Mountains of Virginia
Mountains of Nelson County, Virginia
Mountains on the Appalachian Trail
Blue Ridge Mountains